The following is an episode list for the anime series , the fifth anime addition to the Zoids franchise. The show spanned 50 episodes and originally aired in Japan on TV Tokyo from April 2005 to March 2006. An English dub began airing on Cartoon Network in the Philippines on October 8, 2007.

Theme songs

Opening themes

Note: From episode 21 onwards, a slightly altered opening animation is used, but the song remains unchanged.

Ending themes

Note: The final episode does not have an ending theme. Instead, the credits are rolled over the end of the final scene, followed by shots of Murasame Liger running to Mirodo village taken from the first ending.

Episode list

{|class="wikitable" width="98%"
|-
! width="25" | # !! Title !! width="120" | Original air date !! width="120" | English air date
|-
| colspan="4" bgcolor="#CCF"|                                              
|-

|}

See also
 List of Zoids Chaotic Century/Guardian Force episodes

References

External links
Official Zoids Genesis homepage
 

Zoids Genesis
Episodes